Live Ritual – Friday the 13th is Blasphemy's first live album, first released in 2001 as a limited edition LP record via Nuclear War Now! The first 100 copies of the record (known as the Die Hard Edition by fans) were pressed on red vinyl and came with a bonus CD-R that contained the band's 15-track demo Die Hard Rehearsal, which was recorded at Ross Bay Studios on August 29, 2001. The album was later issued on CD, with the bonus demo, in 2002 through From Beyond Productions.

Track listing

Personnel

Blasphemy
Bestial Saviour Of The Undead Legions – bass
3 Black Hearts Of Damnation And Impurity – drums
Caller Of The Storms – guitar
Deathlord Of Abomination And War Apocalypse – guitar
Nocturnal Grave Desecrator And Black Winds – vocals

Production
Blasphemy – recording (Die Hard Rehearsal)
Yosuke Konishi – recording (Live Ritual – Friday the 13th)
Fir Suidema – remastering
Digz Supko – mastering
Chris Moyen – cover artwork
Othalaz Von Armageddos and Justin Allfather – photography

Release history

References

External links
 

Blasphemy (band) albums
2002 live albums
Friday the 13th